"berkman > block" is the eighth episode and season finale of the second season of the American dark comedy crime television series Barry. It is the 16th overall episode of the series and was written by series co-creators Alec Berg and Bill Hader, and directed by Hader, who also serves as the main lead actor. It was first broadcast on HBO in the United States on May 19, 2019.

The series follows Barry Berkman, a hitman from Cleveland who travels to Los Angeles to kill someone but finds himself joining an acting class taught by Gene Cousineau, where he meets aspiring actress Sally Reed and begins to question his path in life as he deals with his criminal associates such as Monroe Fuches and NoHo Hank. In the episode, Barry sets out to find Fuches after he implicates Gene in Moss's murder, while he also prepares for his performance with Sally. Meanwhile, Hank prepares to go to war with the Bolivians and Burmese but Fuches ends their feud for his own benefit.

According to Nielsen Media Research, the episode was seen by an estimated 2.21 million household viewers and gained a 0.9 ratings share among adults aged 18–49, making it the most watched episode of the series. The episode received universal acclaim from critics, who praised the performances, writing, character development, surprises, action sequences and ending scene. For his performance in the episode, Stephen Root received an Outstanding Supporting Actor in a Comedy Series nomination at the 71st Primetime Emmy Awards.

Plot
Barry (Bill Hader) hurries to the location of Moss's car while Fuches (Stephen Root) prepares to shoot a distracted Gene (Henry Winkler). Fuches is unable to do it and lowers the gun. As the police are approaching, he whispers something in Gene's ear and then flees the scene. Barry sees him running, which leads him to Gene, who has broken down in tears.

Both Barry and Gene are taken into custody. Loach's former partner, Mae Dunn (Sarah Burns), questions Barry and allows him to go. However, she informs him that Gene will remain in custody, as he is the prime suspect for Moss' murder. Barry sends a threatening message to Fuches before leaving the station. Meanwhile, Hank (Anthony Carrigan) and the Chechens have moved to Esther's monastery as their new base of operations and to prepare for their next move against the Bolivians and Burmese. However, Hank is once again threatened by his family, who has sent his successor Batir to Los Angeles. He asks Barry for help but he refuses to cooperate with him again. Hank then finds Fuches in the monastery, who wants shelter.

As Barry and the acting class prepare for their performance, Gene is questioned by Dunn but he fails to answer any of her questions and is taken into custody. When Barry calls, he is informed that Gene will be transferred to the county prison and that he can visit him the next day. He then calls Fuches to promise that he will kill him, while Fuches states that he could just surrender to the police to save Gene. Fuches then leaves the monastery to talk with the Bolivians and Burmese, effectively ending the feud between all three gangs and reconciling Hank with Cristobal (Michael Irby), although Esther (Patricia Fa'asua) is suspicious of Fuches' motives.

Barry's and Sally's performance begins, despite Barry becoming distracted due to Gene's arrest and wanting to kill Fuches. As Barry prepares to throw a table as it was rehearsed, Sally does it instead and the performance plays differently, with Sally actually confronting Sam and finishing their relationship, surprising Barry as he wasn't told of the changes. After the performance, Sally feels bad about lying and Lindsay (Jessy Hodges) consoles her, but Lindsay's colleagues and some audience members praise her performance, making them feel uneasy about the real story.

Barry talks with Gene's son, Leo (Andrew Leeds), who tells him that Gene is set to be released. It is revealed that this was part of a plot by Barry, who planted Hank's pin on Moss' body, making it appear like the Chechens killed her. He asks Leo to inform Gene that he was right about a previous conversation, where Gene said that people can change for the better. Suddenly, Barry then gets a message from Hank that reports Fuches' presence in the monastery and he angrily drives there. Once he arrives, he notices them partying and when Esther calls him out, he coldly kills her.

Fuches then hides throughout the monastery while Barry kills nearly all the people inside. Fuches asks two men to help him, who identify him as Barry's mentor. They take him out through a back door while Mayrbek (Nikita Bogolyubov) and the rest of his gang stay inside. When Barry opens the door, Mayrbek hesitates upon seeing the face of his mentor, allowing Barry to kill him and his men. He barely misses Fuches as he escapes in a van. Batir (JB Blanc) finally arrives at the monastery and finds Hank alive but is actually delighted to see Esther dead. Barry stares at the damage he caused and walks through a dark hallway. At his house, Leo tends to Gene while he remembers Moss. Suddenly, he remembers the moment Fuches showed him Moss's body and remembers what Fuches whispered to him: "Barry Berkman did this."

Production

Development
In May 2019, the episode's title was revealed as "berkman > block" and it was announced that series co-creators Alec Berg and Bill Hader had written the episode while Hader had directed it. This was Berg's sixth writing credit, Hader's sixth writing credit, and Hader's fifth directing credit.

Writing
Bill Hader mentioned that most of the final scenes, from the shooting at the monastery to the final scene, were conceived while he was stuck in traffic while promoting a For Your Consideration event for the first season.

As the writers planned the season, they had the idea of Barry killing people at the monastery but struggled with a motive. Hader didn't want Barry to go to the monastery for no reason as he would now be a "mindless killer." Once they decided to put Fuches in the monastery, the writers settled on Barry's motive: "He's there to kill Fuches, everyone else is just in his way."

Barry's reaction after killing Mayrbek was done to achieve a sense of discomfort, with Hader explaining "Even though we put in those drums and had the rain over it and all that stuff to give it an atmosphere, it's sad. It's a guy disgusted with himself."

Gene discovering Barry's actions wasn't planned in advance, and only came to fruition when the writers worked on the previous episode. They planned to have Fuches not shoot Gene but felt that just leaving wouldn't work, so they added the revelation. Hader admitted at the time that the writers hadn't yet planned out the repercussions of the revelation, as they wanted to test their ability to write themselves in a corner. Coincidentally, the scene was shot on Stage 19 at the Paramount Studios lot, where Winkler's series, Happy Days, filmed.

Filming
The cinematography evoked a meaning for Hader: the first episode of the season had Barry coming out of the darkness and the last scene with Barry involves entering a dark hallway, or "descending back" into darkness. Hader deemed it as "Barry Block is dying and Barry Berkman is taking over."

Reception

Viewers
The episode was watched by 2.21 million viewers, earning a 0.9 in the 18-49 rating demographics on the Nielson ratings scale. This means that 0.9 percent of all households with televisions watched the episode. This was a 18% increase from the previous episode, which was watched by 1.87 million viewers with a 0.8 in the 18-49 demographics.

Critical reviews
"berkman > block" received universal acclaim from critics. Vikram Murthi of The A.V. Club gave the episode a "B+" and wrote, "A stellar finale written by Alec Berg and Bill Hader, 'berkman > block' caps off a great season of television by masterfully tying off every loose end, even ones that were tossed off or buried, and seamlessly connecting the series' two worlds, thematically and narratively. What's most impressive is that it never once feels tidy or closed off. On the contrary, the airtight writing only amplifies the emotional messiness, illustrating how the characters' actions can't be reduced to psychologically pat explanations. People are driven by many conflicting passions, by both positive and negative behavior, by an overwhelming self-awareness and an irrepressible impulse. Berg and Hader go to great lengths to capture the internal contradictions and their unfortunate outcomes."

Ben Travers of IndieWire gave the episode an "A-" and wrote, "Barry Berkman isn't blocked, he's broken — but 'Barry' is only getting better. In the Season 2 finale of Bill Hader's existential HBO comedy, the eponymous hitman-turned-thespian tries to plug up a release valve that's been opened on stage and won't stop flowing off of it. Over the course of eight episodes, Barry spoke his truth to his acting teacher Gene Cousineau, confessing to the worst thing he's ever done, with the intention of never repeating the same mistake again. But in 'berkman > block', Barry did it again, with 10 times the body count." Darren Franich of Entertainment Weekly gave the episode a "B" and wrote, "The finale decided, in gory detail, that Barry couldn't leave his past behind. In Sally's story, Barry landed on a darker message: You can change — and people will love everything about the new you, except the truth. Season 2 had its problems, but astounding sequences like that suggest new evolutions ahead. Barry can't change, but I hope Barry does."

Jen Chaney of Vulture wrote, "Since Better Call Saul is a Breaking Bad prequel, we know going in that Jimmy McGill will eventually transform into Saul Goodman. But on Barry, right up until this finale, there was still a thread of hope that somehow he could turn things around for himself. After watching Barry blow away multiple dangerous people, then walk down that hallway where the lights briefly flicker, then shut off completely, that seems impossible. Barry Berkman, formerly Barry Block, appears to be lost to the darkness forever. Then again, this is Barry. Next season, it could surprise me." Nick Harley of Den of Geek wrote, "Though not as explosive as the Season 1 finale, 'berkman/block' is a more satisfying on a thematic level and an exquisite finish to a phenomenal sophomore outing. Series creators Hader and Alec Berg have said that they like to write themselves into corners and try to find their way out, and now with Gene knowing Barry's dark secret, they better get to work on navigating this particularly tricky corner. If everything that's come before is any indication, they'll work it out." Alison Foreman of Mashable wrote, "In the show's season finale, it was Barry who had finally had enough, putting his enemies under the gun in a horrifying and spectacular display of 'fuck this' firepower that rivaled even the most grisly of Sopranos shoot-outs."

Accolades
Stephen Root submitted the episode in consideration for his Outstanding Supporting Actor in a Comedy Series at the 71st Primetime Emmy Awards.

References

External links
 "berkman > block" at HBO
 

{{DEFAULTSORT:berkamn > block}}

Barry (TV series) episodes
2019 American television episodes
Television episodes written by Bill Hader
Television episodes directed by Bill Hader